The Talloires Declaration is a declaration for sustainability, created for and by presidents of institutions of higher learning. Jean Mayer, Tufts University president, convened a conference of 22 universities in 1990 in Talloires, France.   This document is a declaration that institutions of higher learning will be world leaders in developing, creating, supporting and maintaining sustainability. The registrar for the declaration is the Washington, DC-based organisation University Leaders for a Sustainable Future (ULSF). As of 1 February 2017, 502 college and university presidents have signed the declaration.  These span 55 countries on five continents, with 170 in the United States alone.

Original signatories 
Jean Mayer, President and Conference convener, Tufts University, United States
Professor Julian Crampton, Vice-Chancellor, University of Brighton, United Kingdom
Michele Gendreau-Massaloux, Rector, l'Academie de Paris, France
Prof. Moonis Raza, Vice Chancellor, Delhi University, India
Constance W. Curris, President, University of Northern Iowa, United States
Wesley Posvar, President, University of Pittsburgh, United States
Augusto Frederico Muller, President, Fundacao Universidade Federal de Mato Grosso, Brazil
Calvin H. Pimpton, President and Emeritus, American University of Beirut, Lebanon
T. Navaneeth Rao, Vice Chancellor, Osmania University, India
Stuart Saunders, Vice Chancellor and Principal, University of Cape Town, Union of South Africa
David Ward, Vice Chancellor, University of Wisconsin - Madison, United States
Pablo Arce, Vice Chancellor, Universidad Autonoma de Centro America, Costa Rica
Boonrod Binson, Chancellor, Chulalongkorn University, Thailand
Adamu, Nayaya Mohammed, Vice Chancellor, Ahmadu Bello University, Nigeria
Mario Ojeda Gómez, President, Colegio de Mexico, Mexico
Pavel D. Sarkisow, Rector, D. I. Mendeleev Institute of Chemical Technology, Russia
Akilagpa Sawyerr, Vice Chancellor, University of Ghana, Ghana
Carlos Vogt, President, Universidade Estadual de Campinas, Brazil
Xide Xie, President Emeritus, Fudan University, People's Republic of China
L. Avo Banjo, Vice Chancellor, University of Ibadan, Nigeria
Robert W. Charlton, Vice Chancellor and Principal, University of Witwatersrand, Union of South Africa

External links
Registrar for signatories of Talloires Declaration

Environmental treaties
1990 in France
1990 in the environment